Regional elections in were held in France on 21 and 28 March 2004. At stake were the presidencies of each of France's 26 regions which, although they do not have legislative powers, manage sizeable budgets. The results were a triumph for the parties of the left, led by the French Socialist Party (PS) in alliance with minor parties including the French Communist Party (PCF), the Left Radical Party (PRG) and The Greens (Les Verts). The left has usually fared moderately well in regional elections, but this was their best result since the regional system was introduced.

The left won control of twenty of the twenty-two regions of metropolitan France, defeating the parties of the mainstream right, the Union for a Popular Movement (UMP) and the Union for French Democracy (UDF), and the extreme right National Front (FN). The results were seen as a major setback for the then President Jacques Chirac and Prime Minister Jean-Pierre Raffarin.

National results

Results by region

The first round was held on 21 March. Since no candidate gained a majority in any region, a second round was held on 28 March, in which only candidates who polled more than 10% in the first round were eligible to run (except in Corsica, where the threshold is 5%). The UMP seat numbers are compared to those of the RPR and RPR dissidents together in 1998, the UDF seat numbers are compared to those of the UDF and UDF dissidents together in 1998.

Alsace

See Alsace Regional Council

Regional Council

Conservative Alsace is one of only two regions retained by the right.

Aquitaine

Regional Council

Aquitaine is a traditional stronghold of the left.

Auvergne

Regional Council

The former President of France, Valéry Giscard d'Estaing, was seeking a fourth term as President of Auvergne.

Brittany

Regional Council

Normally conservative Brittany is captured by the left.

Burgundy

Regional Council

Burgundy returned to its usual left-wing loyalty. It is suspected that the incumbent Jean-Pierre Soisson was punished for his coalition with the National Front.

Centre

Regional Council

The left retains control of this region. Sapin replaces the retiring incumbent Alain Rafesthain.

Champagne-Ardenne

Regional Council

The left captures usually conservative Champagne-Ardenne.

Corsica

Regional Council

Conservative Corsica is the right's only success apart from Alsace.

Franche-Comté

Regional Council

The left retakes Franche-Comté.

Île-de-France

Regional Council

The left retains control of Île-de-France, the region surrounding Paris and gets a comfortable majority. Huchon previously could not rely on a majority.

Languedoc-Roussillon

Regional Council

The left re-establishes its usual dominance of Languedoc-Roussillon.

Limousin

Regional Council

The left retains control of Limousin, with Denanot succeeding the retiring incumbent Robert Savy.

Lorraine

Regional Council

The left captures Lorraine.

Midi-Pyrénées

Regional Council

The left retains its traditional dominance of Midi-Pyrénées.

Nord-Pas-de-Calais

Regional Council

Nord-Pas-de-Calais is also a stronghold of the left.

Lower Normandy

Regional Council

The left had never before won control of Lower Normandy.

Upper Normandy

Regional Council

The left retained its traditional hold on Upper Normandy.

Pays de la Loire

Regional Council

The right loses the normally conservative Pays de la Loire region. Fillon was the candidate of the right in succession to the retiring Jean-Luc Harousseau.

Picardy

Regional Council

The left captured the Picardy region, following the retirement of the incumbent, Charles Baur.

Poitou-Charentes

Regional Council

Poitou-Charentes, a region where right and left are traditionally equal, falls to the left. It is the home region of Prime Minister Jean-Pierre Raffarin.

Provence-Alpes-Côte d'Azur

Regional Council

The left retains control of Provence-Alpes-Côte d'Azur.

Jean-Marie Le Pen, who intended to run in this region, was disqualified because he did not fulfill the legal conditions: he neither lived there, nor was registered as a taxpayer there.

Rhône-Alpes

Regional Council

The left captures the usually conservative Rhône-Alpes region.

See also
Conseil régional

External links
Election-Politique Regional Elections since 1986 (in french)

2004
French Regional Elections
Regional Elections